The following is a list of episodes for the CBS comedy television series Still Standing. All episodes in this show except for “Pilot” start with the word “Still”.

Series overview

Episodes

Season 1 (2002–03)

Season 2 (2003–04)

Season 3 (2004–05)

Season 4 (2005–06)

References

External links
 

Still Standing